The 1999 British Rowing Championships known as the National Championships at the time, were the 28th edition of the National Championships, held from 16–18 July 1999 at the National Water Sports Centre in Holme Pierrepont, Nottingham. They were organised and sanctioned by British Rowing, and are open to British crews. A record 748 crews and 2,159 competitors took part in the Championships.

Senior

Medal Summary

Lightweight

Medal Summary

U 23

Medal Summary

Coastal

Medal Summary

Junior

Medal Summary 

Key

References 

British Rowing Championships
British Rowing Championships
British Rowing Championships